The warty frogfish or clown frogfish (Antennarius maculatus) is a marine fish belonging to the family Antennariidae.

Description
Like other members of its family, it has a globulous, extensible body, and its soft skin is covered with small dermal spinules. The skin is covered with numerous small, wart-like protuberances. Its large prognathous mouth allows it to consume prey its same size. The coloring of its body is extremely variable because it tends to match its living environment.

Frogfishes have the capacity to change coloration and pigment pattern in a few weeks : during coral bleaching events, they can even turn to plain white to blend in with the environment. However, the dominant coloration goes from white to black, passing through a whole range of related nuances such as cream, pink, yellow, red, and brown, often with dark, circular spots and/or with saddles. Some heavily spotted specimens can easily be confused with its close relative Antennarius pictus.
This characteristic can help to separate them: usually, A. maculatus has red or orange margins on all fins and sometimes a spike of the saddle blotch starts posterior to the eye.

The first dorsal spine, the illicium is modified and is used as a fishing rod. Its extremity is endowed with a characteristic esca (lure), which looks like a small fish with a pinkish to brownish coloration.  The illicium is twice the length of the second dorsal spine and its often darkly banded. The second dorsal spine is practically straight and is mobile, and the third one is bent towards the back of the body; both are membranously attached to the head. They are well separated from each other and also from the dorsal fin.

The pectoral fins are angled and help, with the pelvic fins, to move the fish on the bottom and to keep a stable position for ambush.

The warty frogfish exhibits biofluorescence, that is, when illuminated by blue or ultraviolet light, it re-emits it as red, and appears differently than under white light illumination. Biofluorescence may assist intraspecific communication and camouflage.

Distribution
A. maculatus lives in the tropical waters of the Indo-Pacific area from Mauritius and Reunion Island  of the center of the Indian Ocean to the western part of the Pacific Ocean.

Habitat

Feeding
As all frogfishes, A. hispidus is a voracious carnivore which can attack all small animals that pass within its "strike range", mainly fishes. Its prey can vary in size to close to its own size.

Behaviour
Like other members of their family, they have a benthic and solitary lifestyle. They gather during mating period, but do not tolerate each other any more after the act of fertilization. The female can kill or eat the male if he stays close.

See also
Japanese common toad

References

External links

 
http://www.frogfish.ch/species-arten/Antennarius-maculatus.html
http://www.fishbase.org/summary/Antennarius-maculatus.html
http://www.itis.gov/servlet/SingleRpt/SingleRpt?search_topic=TSN&search_value=164556
http://www.marinespecies.org/aphia.php?p=taxdetails&id=217850
 

Antennariidae
Fish described in 1840
Taxa named by Julien Desjardins